"Good God Almighty" is a song performed by American contemporary Christian music singer Crowder, released on January 15, 2021, as the lead single to his fourth studio album, Milk & Honey (2021). Crowder co-wrote the song with Jeff Sojka and Ben Glover.

"Good God Almighty" peaked at No. 1 on the US Hot Christian Songs chart. The song also went on to peak at No. 17 on the Bubbling Under Hot 100 chart. "Good God Almighty" received a nomination for the GMA Dove Award Pop/Contemporary Recorded Song of the Year at the 2021 GMA Dove Awards. At the 2022 GMA Dove Awards, the song also received a GMA Dove Award nomination for Song of the Year.

Background
On January 15, 2021, Crowder released "Good God Almighty" as his first single, indicating that he had been making music for the New Year. Crowder shared the story behind the song on social media, saying:

Composition

Reception

Critical response
Joshua Andre of 365 Days of Inspiring Media gave a positive review of "Good God Almighty", describing the song as "a 3 minute fusion between worship, rock and southern gospel- a marriage of genres that wouldn't normally work. But this is Crowder– and he's never been one to shy away from music experimentation. The result is a track that is forever etched into our memories… for the right reasons."

Accolades

Commercial performance
"Good God Almighty" debuted on Christian Airplay chart dated January 23, 2021, at number 29. "Good God Almighty" debuted at number 14 on the US Hot Christian Songs chart dated January 30, 2021, concurrently charting at number one on the Christian Digital Song Sales chart. The song reached No. 1 on the Hot Christian Songs chart dated April 24, 2021, following a surge in streams and downloads after the music video's release. "Good God Almighty" is Crowder's first chart-topping hit on the Hot Christian Songs chart. The song also reached No. 1 on the Christian Airplay chart dated May 15, 2021, becoming Crowder's third Christian Airplay chart-topper.

Music videos
Crowder released audio videos for the original and radio versions of "Good God Almighty" showcasing the single artwork on January 15, 2021. On April 10, 2021, Crowder released the official music video for "Good God Almighty".

Track listing

Personnel
Adapted from AllMusic.
 Adam Ayan – mastering engineer
 Dave Clauss – mixing
 Crowder – vocals
 Ben Glover – producer
 Jeff Sojka – producer

Charts

Weekly charts

Year-end charts

Certifications

Release history

References

External links
 
 

2021 singles
2021 songs
Crowder (musician) songs
Sparrow Records singles
Songs written by Ben Glover